Dictyodes is a genus of flies in the family Sciomyzidae, the marsh flies or snail-killing flies.

Species
D. dictyodes (Wiedemann, 1830)
D. platensis Steyskal, 1956

References

Sciomyzidae
Sciomyzoidea genera